Deendar is a Muslim community in Pakistan. During the British Raj, some members of the Chuhra community converted from Islam to Christianity. After the independence of Pakistan in 1947, some of those Christians converted back to Islam. They and their descendants became known as Deendar or Deendar Changar.

See also
 Muslim Shaikh

References

Social groups of Pakistan
Muslim communities of Pakistan